The Logging Open Service Interface Definition (OSID) is an O.K.I. specification which supports a means of reading and writing log files. OSIDs are programmatic interfaces which comprise a Service Oriented Architecture for designing and building reusable and interoperable software.

Applications can use this service to record activity for a production system while implementations of other OSIDs can use the service to record detailed data during development, debugging, or analyzing performance.

Many Logging implementations are simply a cover for standard logging techniques such as syslog or log4j. The use of this OSID provides an easy way to replace the logging scheme or combine multiple schemes together into a federated pattern.

Logging OSID providers
 log4j
 stdout
 syslog

Software architecture